Wutt Hmone Shwe Yi (sometimes anglicized as Wut Hmone Shwe Yi; born on 10 August 1988) is a two-time Myanmar Academy Award winning Burmese film actress and commercial model. She is the Myanmar's one of the highest-paid actresses and considered one of the most commercially successful actresses in Burmese cinemas. 

She won her first Myanmar Academy Award for Best Actress in 2013 with the film As U Like, achieved her second award for Best Supporting Actress in 2014 with the film Made in Heart. In 2020, she was recognized  in Forbes Asia's 100 Digital Stars List which shows Asia-Pacific's most influential celebrities on social media.

Early life
Wutt Hmone Shwe Yi was born on 10 August 1988 in Mogok to parents, Win Thein Naing and Nang Mi Mi Lwin, of Shan descent. She is the eldest daughter and has a younger sister named Nadi Shwe Yi. She went to BEHS 2 Kamayut (St.Augustine) and graduated from Dagon University with a degree in English.

Career
After the university, she initially participated in Teen magazine and Beauty magazine and later appeared on commercial billboards and magazines for Kanebo cosmetic. She started her acting with advertisements in 2005. She gained more popularity from the advertisements such as Kanebo and Hometex etc. She starred in the films in 2008. She was awarded the Myanmar Academy Award for Best Actress in 2013.

In 2014, she was named a brand ambassador for Huawei Company. In 2013, Myanmar Times named her as one of the 50 Outstanding Myanmar Women. Wutt Hmone Shwe Yi participated in Myanmar Famous Actor Pyay Ti Oo's Pyay Ti Oo Foundation Fund Raising Concert for students on December 4, 2011. She donated all her artist fees for the foundation.

From 2008 to present, she has acted in over 300 TV commercials, 200 direct-to-videos and 40 films in her career. According to The Myanmar Times, The Only Mom, in which Wutt Hmone Shwe Yi starred, directed in Myanmar by Thai director Chartchai Ketnust, was the most successful Myanmar movie in 2019. It told the story of a Burmese family that moved into a colonial-era haunted house.

Personal life
She is the cousin of Myanmar model and actress Phway Phway.

She donated the golden star from her film academy award to the Aungzabu Tawya Monastery in Hmawbi, Yangon on February 1, 2015. She also said that it was One of her Happiest Days.

Her relationship with Sai Sai Kham Leng was one of the most fascinating relationships amongst the Burmese celebrity world. However, they broke up after some years.

Publications
She released her photo album, The Portfolio of Hmone Hmone on 14 August 2011. She launched her first limited collection, handmade pillow kit on 31 August 2014. On October 21, Wutt Hmone Shwe Yi launched her second limited collection, Scarfs. Her third limited collection, Necklace, Brooch, Earring & Necklace was launched on 8 July 2015. And MiniKitKit is launched on March 9, 2016

Direct-to-video

Film (cinema)

Awards and nominations

References

External links
 
 
 

Living people
Burmese film actresses
1988 births
21st-century Burmese actresses
People from Mandalay Region
Burmese people of Shan descent